The Trincheras Formation (Kitr) is a geological formation of the Altiplano Cundiboyacense, Eastern Ranges of the Colombian Andes. The formation, deposited in a marine platform environment, part of a transgressive cycle, hosts ammonite, bryozoan, mollusc and echinoid fossils.

Etymology 
The formation was defined and named in 1969 by Cáceres and Etayo after Quebrada Trincheras, Apulo, Cundinamarca.

Description

Lithologies 
Fossils of the ammonites Heinzia sp., Pseudohaploceras sp., Heminautilus etheringtoni, Cheloniceras sp. and bryozoans, molluscs and echinoids have been found in the Trincheras Formation.

Stratigraphy and depositional environment 
The Trincheras Formation is the lowermost unit of the Villeta Group, and conformably overlies the Murca, La Naveta and Útica Formations. The formation is overlain in a transitional pattern by the Socotá and El Peñón Formations. The Trincheras Formation is subdivided into the El Tigre and Anapoima Members. The age has been estimated to be Early Aptian. Stratigraphically, the formation is time equivalent with the fossiliferous Paja Formation of Boyacá and the Las Juntas Formation. The formation has been deposited in a marine well oxygenated platform environment. In terms of sequence stratigraphy, this phase was transgressional.

Outcrops 

The Trincheras Formation is apart from its type locality in Apulo, found near La Mesa and Anapoima, in the Villeta Anticlinal, the Murca-Guayabal-Nimaima Anticlinal and along the roads between Pacho and La Palma and Útica-La Peña. The formation also crops out around San Joaquín east of La Mesa, and on the right bank of the Bogotá River near Apulo.

The reverse Bituima Fault thrusts the Trincheras Formation on top of the Güagüaquí Group, while the Bogotá River Fault laterally displaces the formation near Anapoima.

Regional correlations

See also 

 Geology of the Eastern Hills
 Geology of the Ocetá Páramo
 Geology of the Altiplano Cundiboyacense

References

Bibliography

Maps

External links 
 

Geologic formations of Colombia
Cretaceous Colombia
Lower Cretaceous Series of South America
Aptian Stage
Shale formations
Open marine deposits
Formations
Geography of Cundinamarca Department